Reisepass is the German word for passport. It may refer to:

 Austrian passport
 German passport
 Liechtenstein passport
 Swiss passport